Christian Augustus Henry Allhusen (1806–1890) was a Danish-English chemical manufacturer based in the North East of England. Born in Kiel when it was in the Danish  Duchy of Holstein, he and his family were displaced when Marshall Davoust, Napoleon's "Iron Marshall," occupied the family home as his headquarters. Allhusen was employed by Koch & Sons, grain merchants of Rostock and then moved to Newcastle, where he was employed by Campbell & Reveley, also grain merchants. Allhusen became a British citizen by a private Act of Parliament. He later went into partnership with Henry Bolckow and expanded into the ship and insurance brokerage business.

In 1840, Allhusen purchased a soap works in Gateshead, and began the manufacture of chemicals, eventually calling the company C. Allhusen & Sons. In 1871, Allhusen converted his enterprise into a joint-stock company, Newcastle Chemical Works, Ltd. He made a large fortune, and was influential in the region as company director and shareholder in such companies as the Northumberland & Durham District Bank, the Newcastle & Gates Water Company and the Consett Iron Works. He was an active member of the Newcastle Chamber of Commerce and the Tyne Commission.

In 1854, Allhusen was among local industrialists urging construction of a new quay for Gateshead. When the quay was eventually constructed, the local government failed to include necessary transportation facilities to allow efficient transport to and from the quay facility. As a result, the quay complex required years of subsidies and struggled to avoid failure as Allhusen had predicted.

Allhusen died on 13 January 1890 at Stoke Court, Stoke Poges, Buckinghamshire.

References

See also
Oxford Dictionary of National Biography, Allhusen, Christian Augustus Henry (1806–1890), chemical manufacturer by N. G. Coley, rev.

1806 births
1890 deaths
Danish emigrants to the United Kingdom
Businesspeople from Tyne and Wear
Businesspeople from Kiel
19th-century English businesspeople